Zaarouriye (in Arabic : زعرورية), also written Zaarourieh, is a town in the mountains of Chouf District in the Mont-Liban state of Lebanon. It is located 750 meters above sea level and is 40 kilometers from Beirut. Its population is estimated at 3,000 people in the summer, and is mainly Sunni and Maronite. Once an agricultural area with olives, figs and fruiting vines, its economy is now based on civil servants and a service economy.

Trees in the area include hawthorn, wild pine, carob and oak. There are two elementary schools, a middle school and a high school in a shared building.

References

External links
A photo montage video of the area (begins 30 seconds in)
 Zaarouriyeh,  Localiban 

Populated places in Chouf District
Sunni Muslim communities in Lebanon